Gnathotrichus materiarius, the American utilizable wood bark beetle, is an ambrosia beetle in the family Curculionidae. It is native to North America, but has been introduced to several European countries. It lives in symbiosis with the fungus Endomycopsis fasciculata, which adult beetles inoculate into the wood of host trees - the fungus then acts as the primary food source of the larvae and adults.

References

Further reading

External links

Scolytinae
Articles created by Qbugbot
Beetles described in 1858